Abbeyhill railway station was a railway station located in the Abbeyhill area of Edinburgh. It was served by trains on several Edinburgh local rail services. The station was on the line that branched off the East Coast Main Line at Abbeyhill Junction.

History

Opened by the North British Railway on 1 May 1869, it became part of the London and North Eastern Railway during the Grouping of 1923. The line then passed on to the Scottish Region of British Railways on nationalisation in 1948. The station was closed by the British Railways Board in 1964 along with Piershill, Portobello, Joppa and Musselburgh stations when the Musselburgh branch service was withdrawn. One station platform still exists but is covered by overgrown weeds and shrubs.

Abbeyhill Junction
Abbeyhill Junction connected the East Coast Main Line towards Abbeyhill railway station. Passenger services stopped using this line in the 1960s but briefly reopened in 1986 as a shuttle service was set up from Waverley station and Meadowbank Stadium railway station for the Commonwealth Games. Abbeyhill Junction signal box closed on 6 November 1938, when an old box at Waverley East took over control of the junction.

The junction closed in 1986 as the line was not being used any more, even for freight. In 1988, the tracks were disconnected at both ends of the line. The tracks remained, overgrown, for over 18 years until 2007 when the lines were dismantled and the area where the lines were was concreted over.

References

Sources

  
Leith stations and Edinburgh loop map

External links

Disused railway stations in Edinburgh
Railway stations in Great Britain opened in 1869
Railway stations in Great Britain closed in 1964
Beeching closures in Scotland
Former North British Railway stations
1869 establishments in Scotland
1964 disestablishments in Scotland